Viggianello is a commune in the Corse-du-Sud department of France on the island of Corsica.

Location

Viggianello is in the western plain to the east of the coastal town of Propriano.
It lies between the Baraci river to the north and the Rizzanese river to the south.
The  Punta Savaziglia is on the eastern border of the commune.

Population

See also
Communes of the Corse-du-Sud department

References

Communes of Corse-du-Sud